Great Balls of Fire is a rock 'n roll record and the final album recorded by American actress and singer Mae West, released by MGM Records in 1972.

It was the third album release by West. Originally recorded in 1968, the album was released four years later, a few months before West turned 79. The record consisted of covers of rock classics and new original songs. It was produced by Ian Whitcomb and featured background vocals by The Mike Curb Congregation. Great Balls of Fire was not a commercial success and did not chart.

Neil Sedaka's cover of "Happy Birthday Sweet Sixteen" does not feature the original words and instead features new tongue-in-cheek lyrics written by Whitcomb, referring to age 21 as West celebrates the coming-of-age of a devoted fan. That version is generally known as "Happy Birthday Twenty-One". West later performed this song in her final motion picture, Sextette (1978).

The liner notes on the UK release, (MGM 2315207), credit strings, horns, and arrangements to Jerry Styner.
They further state that Val Valentin was in charge of the Mastering at MGM Studios.

Track listing
Side A

Side B

References

External links

1972 albums
Mae West albums
MGM Records albums